A brony  (plural: bronies) is an adult (and especially male) fan of the My Little Pony: Friendship Is Magic franchise.

Brony or Bronies also may  refer to:
 Works evoking the brony meme:
 Bronies: The Extremely Unexpected Adult Fans of My Little Pony 2012 documentary film
 A Brony Tale, 2014 documentary film
 Brony, Łódź Voivodeship, city in Poland

See also
Bronny (LeBron James Jr.), American basketball player
Bro (disambiguation)
Brownie (disambiguation)